Ankara National Lottery Anatolian High School is an Anatolian High School in Ankara, founded by the Turkish National Lottery Administration (Millî Piyango İdaresi) and given to the Turkish Ministry of Education in 1992. The school is located in the upscale district of Ankara called Gaziosmanpaşa.

With the help of its location and the newer building (at 1992), the school very quickly became one of the best Anatolian High Schools in Ankara. In the following years, MPAL students showed distinctive performance in ÖSS (University Entrance Exam), which provided a popularity boost to school.

Because of the successful ÖSS performance of the school, most of the students who show better performance in the OKS (High School Entrance Exam) choose MPAL for their high school education in Ankara.

High schools in Ankara
Educational institutions established in 1992
1992 establishments in Turkey